An  bronze sculpture of Vasilios Priskos by Daniel Fairbanks is installed in Salt Lake City, Utah, United States.

References

2020 establishments in Utah
2020 sculptures
Bronze sculptures in Utah
Monuments and memorials in Utah
Outdoor sculptures in Salt Lake City
Sculptures of men in Utah
Statues in Utah